Dessau-Alten station is a railway station in the Alten district of the town of Dessau, located in Saxony-Anhalt, Germany.

References

Alten
Buildings and structures in Dessau